Gott's may refer to:
Gott's Park or Armlet Park, park in  Leeds, West Yorkshire, Northern England
Gott's Roadside, Northern California restaurant group

See also
Gott (disambiguation)